The George P. Fernald House is a historic house at 12 Rock Hill Street in Medford, Massachusetts.  The Colonial Revival mansion was built c. 1895 for George P. Fernald, an architect and leading exponent of the Colonial Revival style.  The house was probably designed by Fernald, possibly with the assistance of his brother Albert, who was also an architect.  The house has a two-story Ionic pedimented portico that shelters an elaborate Federal-style entry, supposedly influenced by Fernald's work making drawings of the Count Rumford Birthplace in Woburn, Massachusetts.

The house was listed on the National Register of Historic Places in 1976.

See also
National Register of Historic Places listings in Medford, Massachusetts
National Register of Historic Places listings in Middlesex County, Massachusetts

References

Houses on the National Register of Historic Places in Medford, Massachusetts
Houses in Medford, Massachusetts